Muhajreen is a municipality and a neighborhood in the central part of Damascus, Syria, on the slopes of Mount Qasioun. The name means 'the immigrants'. It contains Abu Rummaneh, Al-Haboubi, Al-Maliki, Al-Marabit, Al-Mastaba, Al-Rawda and Shura.

History
The village was first settled by Cretan Muslim immigrants in the late 19th century after they fled Crete, and was initially a suburb on the mountain.

References

Neighborhoods of Damascus